BW Goes C&W is the ninth studio album by American singer-songwriter Bobby Womack. The album was released on June 11, 1976, by United Artists Records. The album was released amid growing tensions between Womack and United Artists Records, who strongly opposed Womack releasing a country album at a time when many soul artists were moving towards glossier R&B and disco. United Artists relented and allowed the album's release after Womack agreed not to use the original title Step Aside, Charley Pride, Give Another Nigger a Try. Poor sales and negative critical reception resulted in Womack leaving United Artists for Columbia Records.

Track listing

Personnel 
Bobby Womack - vocals, guitar, primary artist

References 

1976 albums
Bobby Womack albums
United Artists Records albums
Albums produced by Bobby Womack